Frank Jardine may refer to:

 Frank Jardine (ice hockey) (1924–1999), British ice hockey player
 Francis Lascelles Jardine (1841–1919), Australian pioneer